Francis Joseph Mulroney (April 8, 1903 – November 11, 1985) was a relief pitcher in Major League Baseball who played briefly for the Boston Red Sox during the  season. A native of Mallard, Iowa, he attended University of Iowa.
 
Mulroney posted a 0–1 record with a 3.00 ERA and two strikeouts in two relief appearances, allowing one run and three hits in 3.0 innings of work without saves.
 
Mulroney died at the age of 82 in Aberdeen, Washington.

See also
1930 Boston Red Sox season
Boston Red Sox all-time roster

External links
Baseball Reference
Retrosheet

Boston Red Sox players
Major League Baseball pitchers
University of Iowa alumni
Baseball players from Iowa
1903 births
1985 deaths